Beaudrouin is a rural settlement in the Jérémie commune in the Jérémie Arrondissement, in the Grand'Anse department of Haiti.

References

Populated places in Grand'Anse (department)